Nor Azlan Bakar (born 14 December 1977) is a Malaysian field hockey player. He competed in the men's tournament at the 2000 Summer Olympics.

References

External links
 

1977 births
Living people
Malaysian male field hockey players
Olympic field hockey players of Malaysia
Field hockey players at the 2000 Summer Olympics
Place of birth missing (living people)
Commonwealth Games medallists in field hockey
Commonwealth Games silver medallists for Malaysia
Field hockey players at the 1998 Commonwealth Games
Field hockey players at the 2006 Commonwealth Games
2002 Men's Hockey World Cup players
Medallists at the 1998 Commonwealth Games